Verne M. Willaman (August 20, 1928 – June 9, 2012) was a business executive and philanthropist.  He was  chairman and president of  pharmaceutical firm Ortho Pharmaceutical Corporation and director and member of the executive committee of Johnson & Johnson.

Early life and education
Willaman was born in Greenville, Pennsylvania, and grew up in Fredonia, Pennsylvania.  He graduated from  Pennsylvania State University in 1951 with a degree in biological chemistry, and then served a tour of duty in the U.S. Navy during the Korean War aboard the aircraft carrier .

Career
Willaman began his career as a pharmaceutical sales representative for Ortho Pharmaceutical  and rose through the executive ranks to  president in 1969 and chairman in 1976. He became a director and member of the executive committee of Johnson & Johnson in 1977 and retired in 1988. Among his other  professional activities was service on the board of directors and the executive committee of the Pharmaceutical Manufacturers Association and the board of directors of the American Federation of Pharmaceutical Education.

He  was a trustee of the Somerset County Medical Center,  a founding member of the Middlesex County Multiple Sclerosis Society and also served on the National Council of Crime and Delinquency and as a trustee of Marcus J. Lawrence Memorial Hospital in Arizona.

Philanthropy

Willaman is among the largest individual donors to Pennsylvania State University having donated more than $27 million to the university. His gifts to Penn State included  endowed positions in the Eberly College of Science including the dean's chair, faculty chairs and professorships in Astronomy and Astrophysics, Mathematics, Biology and Statistics. He also provided support for graduate fellowships and a range of projects and programs.

Penn State honored Willaman as a Distinguished Alumnus in 1993.  In 2004, the university named the Willaman Gateway to the Sciences in his honor.

In honor of his parents, he established the Prescott and Mary Willaman Scholarships to assist undergraduates with financial need and a proven academic record.  Willaman also provided substantial financial support to numerous other charitable causes supporting the arts, sciences, veterans, churches, libraries and school programs.

In 1999 Slate magazine included Willaman in its annual Slate60 which profiles the 60 largest American charitable contributions for the year.

Personal life
Willaman had two children, a son Mark M. Willaman and a daughter Wendy Willaman.

References

Businesspeople in the pharmaceutical industry
2012 deaths
1928 births
Eberly College of Science alumni